Sharifani or Upper Sharifani  is a village in the north-west of the Sindh. Some nearby major cities are Kamber   and Larkana  from this village. Sharifani is one of the oldest villages of Sindh. Agriculture is the primary occupation of the villagers. Children are taught the art of farming at a very young age. The social structure of the village is patriarchal with men considered as the head of the family.

Customs And Traditions
Like most of the villages traditions, customs  and the bonds of family unity are more dominant than in the cities which is the main reason why people of the village do not migrate to cities and stick with their customs, traditions and teachings given by their ancestors.

Travel And Transport
Most of the villagers have their personal transport and usually travel to nearer cities like Kamber and Larkana either to buy groceries, food or in case  of emergency because this village does not have hospital or medical care. The school in the village  is of primary level and that is why  the boys or girls who pass 5th Grade travel to Khairpur Juso, Kamber or Larkana for High School Studies.

Sport
People of this village work hard all day that they rarely have enough time and energy to play sport but still they manage to play other sport. Cricket is common sport here.

References

Villages in Sindh